Alexiadis is a Greek surname. Notable people with the surname include:

Alekos Alexiadis (born 1945), Greek footballer
Tryfon Alexiadis (born 1960), Greek politician and tax collector

Greek-language surnames
Patronymic surnames
Surnames from given names